Divadlo v Dlouhé is a repertoire theatre with a permanent group of actors established in 1996 as a set financed by the Municipality of Prague. The group of actors comprises graduates of the Theatre Academy of Musical Arts, part of the actors have studied in the Department of Alternative and Marionette Theatre of this academy. The young group is highly talented in terms of dance and music. The repertoire spans from great dramatic stories to non-traditional cabarets. The Theatre holds the Child in Dlouhá / Dítě v Dlouhé festival at which the most interesting plays for children's theatre are featured. Divadlo v Dlouhé was nominated several times for Alfréd Radok Award in the category Theatre of the Year. Grabbe's Don Juan and Faust and Sestra Úzkost won the category Performance of the Year.

The theatre is headed by Daniela Šálková. The key directors are Hana Burešová and Jan Borna. The most prominent actors are Miroslav Táborský, Jan Vondráček, Vlastimil Zavřel, Jaroslava Pokorná and Klára Sedláčková. Notable guest actors include Karel Roden, Martin Huba and Petr Skoumal.

See also 
 If the Pig Had Wings

External links 
Official site

Theatres in Prague
1996 establishments in the Czech Republic
Theatres completed in 1996
20th-century architecture in the Czech Republic